This is a list of television programs broadcast by VH1 Europe in Europe.

Last programming

Music series
 VH1 Shuffle (2012–2021)
 Guess The Year (2014–2021)
 Top 50 (2014-2021)
 Hits Don't Lie (2015-2021)
 We Love The: 00's (2015–2021)
 Artist: The Hits (2019-2021)
 Songs of the Century (2020-2021)
 00s Power Ballads! (2021)
 Class of 2000-2009 (2021)
 Crazy in Love! (only August 1, 2021)
 Hottest 00s Collabs! (2021)
 Hottest 00s Dance Hits! (2021)
 Hottest 00s Pop Hits! (2021)
 Hottest 00s R'n'B Hits! (2021)
 Loudest 00s Rock Anthems! (2021)
 Non-stop Nostalgia! (only August 1, 2021)
 The 40 Greatest Hits! (only August 1, 2021)

Artists' series
 Adele (2019-2020)
 Alicia Keys (2021)
 Ariana Grande (2019-2020)
 Beyonce (2019-2021)
 Black Eyed Peas (2021)
 Britney Spears (2021)
 Bruno Mars (2019-2020)
 Calvin Harris (2019-2021)
 Coldplay (2019-2021)
 Dua Lipa (2020)
 Elton John (2020-2021)
 Ed Sheeran (2019-2021)
 George Michael (2020-2021)
 Jennifer Lopez (2021)
 Justin Bieber (2020-2021)
 Justin Timberlake (2019-2021)
 Katy Perry (2019-2021)
 Kelly Clarkson (2020)
 Kylie (Minogue) (2020-2021) 
 Lady Gaga (2019-2021)
 Little Mix (2020)
 Madonna (2019-2021)
 Maroon 5 (2019-2021)
 One Direction (2019-2021)
 P!nk (2019-2021)
 Queen (2019-2020)
 Rihanna (2019-2021)
 Sam Smith (2020)
 Shawn Mendes (2020)
 Taylor Swift (2019-2021)
 Whitney Houston (2020-2021)

Top 50 series
 00's vs. 10's (2019-2021)
 00's Collabs (2021)
 00's Boys (2021)
 Fierce Girls of the 00's (2021)
 00's Greatest Hits (2021)
 00's Pop Hits (2021)
 00's Rock Anthems (2021)
 A-List Boys (2019-2020)
 A-List Girls (2019-2020)
 Boys vs. Girls (2019-2021)
 Boy Bands vs. Girl Groups (2019-2020)
 Collabs (2020)
 Crazy in Love! 00's Love Songs (?-2021) 
 Dance vs. Pop (2019)
 Duets (2020-2021)
 Especially for You! (2019-2020)
 Love Songs (2019-2021)
 Party Classics (2019-2021)
 Party vs. Pop (2019-2020)
 Sing-A-Longs (2020)
 Sing-A-Longs of the 00's (2020-2021)
 Songs that defined 00's (2020-2021)
 Ultimate Show-Men of All Time! (2021)
 Ultimate Show-Women of All Time! (2021)
 Ultimate Power Ballads  (?-2021)

Former programming

Music series

 2-4-1 Hits (2017-2018)
 90's Revolution (2011-2012)
 90's vs. 80's (2012-2013)
 Aerobic (?-2012)
 Best Of Charts
 Best Of The Week
 Before The Weekend
 Boogie Night
 Celebrity Showdown
 Chill Out
 Class of 2000-2019 (2020-2021)
 Cover Power (?-2012)
 Expresso
 Feelgood Friday (2012–?)
 Flipside
 Final Countdown
 Huge Hits (2014–?)
 It Takes Two (2015–2017)
 Keep Calm & Wind Down (2014–?)
 Greatest Hits
 Late Night Love (2012–2017)
 Lazy Sunday Tunes (2015–2018)
 Love Is In The Air! (?-2013-?) 
 Music Never Felt So Good
 Music For The Masses
 Perfect Pop From The 00's (2015–?)
 Popstars (2018-2019)
 Popup Videos
 Rise And Shine With VH1 (2012–2019)
 Saturday Night 80's Disco! (2012-2013)
 Saturday Night Fever
 Saturday Soundtrack (2015–2018)
 Sing-along of the Century! (?-2019)
 Smells Like The 90's
 Smooth Wake Up
 So 80's
 Sunday Soul
 The Album Chart Show
 The Ultimate Movie Soundtracks (2015–?)
 Then & Now (2011-2014)
 This Week's VH1 Top 10 (2015-2020)
 Top 10 (?-2012)
 Top 100 (2014-2016)
 Total Pop Party (2014–2017)
 VH1 Chill (2017-2018)
 VH1 Classic
 VH1 Club (2013-2014)
 VH1 Loves
 VH1 Music
 VH1 New
 VH1 Oldschool
 VH1 Pop Chart
 VH1 Rocks
 VH1 Superchart
 VH1 Themed
 Viva La Disco
 We Heart The: 90's (2014-2015)
 We Love The: 10's (2015–2020)
 Weekend Special
 Weekend Warm Up!
 Wild 80's (2011-2012)

See also
 MTV
 List of MTV channels

References

MTV
VH1